Karopady is a small village in Dakshina Kannada district, Karnataka, in far southern India. It is the border village between Karnataka and Kerala. Kasaragod District is the neighbouring district in Kerala State.

Karopady is situated between Anekallu and Kanyana. Mambady, Aneyala, Gundamajalu, Kattatharu, Maindamoole, Palige, Mithanadka, Pambathaje, Padyana, Palige, Kandelu, Gubbya, Bamblimar, Althadka, Kabbinamoole, Bengadapadpu, Pattla and Kaimar are some of the small places within Karopady. The place called Anekallu belongs to the Karopady and Vorkady panchayath of Kasargod. The river called Anekallu river has divided Karopady from Vorkady kodlamugaru panchayath, situated in the north part of Kerala State. vijayadka is one of the important place in Karopady because of education and hospital facilities provided by st lawrence church Vijayadka.

There are several ways to reach Karopady village. From Mangalore, a bus connects to Uppala, and then another bus travelling to Vittal or Puttur, and down at Nellikatte. Another bus from Mangalore, or Puttur, to Vittal, then connects to a direct bus to Mittanadka or a bus from Vittal to Uppala (the alias name is "Kurchipalla") or Bedagudde, and down at Nellikatte. There are direct buses from Mangalore and Manjeshwar to vijayadka.

Industries
Beedi-leaf rolling is the major industry which can be seen in Karopady.

Small scale industries like araca-nut-leaf plate-making industries, or homemade foods, have been growing in recent times.

The organisation called Sri Gurudev Public Charitable Trust has been working for the development of this area and has provided an opportunity for the needy in providing self-employment in this area.

File manufacturing industry (Tushar Industry) was started by Mr. Hariprasad, at Kanyana.

Agriculture
Agriculture is the main occupation of the people in Karopady. One can see picturesque paddy fields throughout the area. Areca nut, coconuts, bananas, peppers, and cocoa are grown on a large scale in Karopady.

Advanced techniques are utilised by the agriculturists of this area.

Language
There are people speaking in various mixed languages in Karopady. Konkani, Kannada, Havyaka Tulu, Beary and Malayalam are some of the commonly spoken languages in the Karopady village. Havyaka Brahmins speak old Kannada called Havyaka Kannada, or Haveeka language. These languages are found in the area of Dakshina Kannada and parts of Udupi Districts.

Commercial industries 
 Shreesha Industries - office file manufacturing industry - Anekallu 
 Asmith Bottlings - manufacturer of soft drinks branded as Setron, Paico
 Araca nut leaves plate making industry - eco-friendly plates are manufactured in the different places of the village and it is a small-scale industry
 Padi Poultray Farmes - producing High Ginius Boiler Chicken
 Immanuel General store, Vijayadka
 G1 Books and stationery, Vijayadka
 Grocery Shop, Vijayadka
 Grocery shop, Maindamoole
 Grocery shop, Gundamajalu
 Victor Tailor, Maindamoole

Banks and financial institutions
 Syndicate Bank, Kanyana
 Odiyoor Shree Vividoddesha Sowaharda Sahakari Limited Odiyoor head office & Kanyana Branch
 Karopady Co-op Agricultural Bank Ltd at Mithanadka, Bedagudda and Kanyana
 Vittal Grameena Sahakari Bank Ltd, Branch Kanyana
 KMF branches at vijayadka, Mithanadka

  Samadka Badriya Juma MAsjid, samadka karopady.
 Shree Odiyoor Gurudevadatta Samsthanam
 St Lawrence Church vijayadka
 Kudpolthai Deivastanam Kudpalthadka
 Shree Padyana Mahalingeshwara Temple
 Dhoomavathi Daivasthana Padyana
 Kallurti Daivasthana Padyana
 Shree Durgaparameshwari Temple Padyana
 Shree Navadurga Sri Lakshmi Janardhana Temple Pambattaje
 Shree Rama Bajana Mandhira, Palladakody
 Shree Rajarajeshwari Mandira Bedagudda
 Bharathi Bhajana Mandira, Kudpalthadka
 Betha Sri Durgaparameshwari Ammanavara Gudi
 Rakteshwari and Guliga Daivasthana Anekallu, Malar Road
 Sri Umamaheshwara Matta Kodla, Karopady
 Mitthanadka Malaraya Boothastana
 Karopady Juma Masjid
 Shree Vagenadu Subraya Temple
 Shree Korathi Katte Kalai
 Shree Jaladurgaparameshwari Temple, Anekallu, Padpu
 St Lawrence Church Vijayadka
 Sirajul Huda Madarasa Padi
 munavvirul Islam madrasa Gundamajalu
 SSF Gundamajalu unit office Gumdamajalu

Institutions 
Shree Gurudeva Public Charitale Trust
 Shree Gurudeva Gurukula
 Shree Gurudeva Primary & High School
 Shree Gurudeva ITI COllege
St. Lawrence primary school Vijayadka
St. Lawrence higher primary school Vijayadka
St. Lawrence English medium school Vijayadka 
 Dakshina Kannada District Zilla Panchayat Higher Primary School Pambattaje 

Villages in Dakshina Kannada district